Guy de Muyser, born 20 June 1926 at Wiltz, Hon.Marshal of the Court of the Grand Duke of Luxembourg, Honorary Ambassador, made his university studies in law (PhD), foreign relations (MA) and economy (BA) in France, Britain and the United States. Now lecturer at MIAMI U, Luxembourg Center  Benevolent  Board member, advisor of several civil society associations.  Married in 1956 to Milliat Dominique (1930-2015). He is the father of Isabelle de Muyser (Madame Christian Boucher), Xavier de Muyser and Alain de Muyser, 7 grandchildren.

Sources

See also 
 List of Permanent Representatives of Luxembourg to NATO

1926 births
Ambassadors of Luxembourg to Belgium
Luxembourgian diplomats
Luxembourgian jurists
People from Luxembourg City
Permanent Representatives of Luxembourg to NATO
Living people